Hamm (Westf) Hauptbahnhof (often abbreviated Hamm (Westf) or simply Hamm (W)) is a railway station situated in the city of Hamm in the German state of North Rhine-Westphalia.
It is notable for its station building inspired by art deco and Gründerzeit building styles. The station is one of the important InterCityExpress rail hubs in the eastern Ruhr area and is among the high-profile buildings of Hamm.
Until the decline of rail freight after the Second World War, it featured one of Europe's largest marshalling yards.

History 
The station at Hamm was opened on 2 May 1847, when the first train of the Köln-Mindener Eisenbahn reached the city. It had been planned from the very beginning to make Hamm a railway hub, therefore the line to Münster (1848) and the line to Paderborn via Soest (1850) were opened soon thereafter. Both lines were built and operated by the Königlich-Westfälische Eisenbahn. Finally, in 1866, the Bergisch-Märkische Eisenbahn connected their line to Hagen via Unna to the growing station.

Due to the explosive increase in traffic at the height of the industrial age, the station was soon unable to cope with the growing demand. A separate marshalling yard was built in the 1880s, situated on the southern side of the passenger station. However, this did not provide real relief, and therefore the station area underwent major reconstruction starting in 1911 and finishing by 1929. The railway lines were laid on elevated embankments and the trackbed inside the station was raised, the old station building, originally built as an island platform, was torn down and replaced by the current building, the construction of which was finished by 1920.

The original marshalling yard was replaced by a new structure further south, consisting of three hump yards. The yard serving the East-West trains (operated from signal box Hvw) was one of the first to receive a mechanised hump in 1925. Two new depots were also built near the station, Hamm P for passenger services and Hamm G for freight operations.

Over the years, Hamm prospered and grew quite notably due to its newfound role as a railway town.

During World War II, the station was a prime target due to its strategic location and its large marshalling yard and suffered from numerous air attacks. Most of these were carried out by the British RAF Bomber Command. Over 80% of Hamm lay in ruins after the war, and the station was no exception. Passenger services resumed on 18 June 1945 on the line to Dortmund and Duisburg, and on 20 June that year on the lines to Bielefeld, Münster and Soest.

The first line to be electrified was the line from Hamm to Düsseldorf Hbf on 10 May 1957. Electrification continued over the next decades, and was finished in December 1970 with the line to Paderborn.

In 1984, Hamm started to see InterCity services calling at the station, and since the early 1990s InterCityExpress trains call at the station as well.

The marshalling yard, despite having been renovated in the 1960s, was partly closed after Deutsche Bundesbahn became the private Deutsche Bahn AG. Of the three humps originally present in the yard, two of them (near signal boxes Hro and Vmo) were closed. The marshalling yard nowadays operates at only 10% of its original 10,000 wagon per day capacity. The two depots and the maintenance works are also operating at reduced capacity. The mail station, which even had its own hump, has been completely closed as mail trains were abolished soon after the privatization of the former Deutsche Bundespost in the early 1990s. The access tracks have been removed and the area was sold off to investors.

Station building 

The current station hall was opened on 14 October 1920. It is a good example of the historism building style, reminiscent of the German Gründerzeit style and incorporating Jugendstil elements, designed by an unknown architect.

The building sustained damage to parts of the roof and the vault during World War II, but was swiftly rebuilt after the war.
In 1985, the station hall was modernised in a contemporary style, and the front walls were clad with sheet metal. A new ticket hall made of glass was also added into the main station hall. Public opinion, however, was not in favour of the typical 1980s building style, and the topic of renovation resurfaced as early as the mid-1990s. The station therefore was properly restorated to its original state. Since the station hall had meanwhile become a listed building (in 1990), great attention was paid to detail. The station received the Europa Nostra Award in 2001 for the restoration effort.

Operational usage

Services at the station 
The station building is fully accessible to the disabled and features lifts to all platforms except to tracks 12 and 13.
The ticket hall is open Mon to Fri 6:00 to 19:30, Sat 7:30 to 18:00 and Sun 9:30 to 19:00. There also is a service desk in the station hall, as well as a bistro, a bakery, a pharmacy and a bookshop. The railway mission is situated near platform 3.

With the exceptions of lines 7, and 17, all of Hamm's city buses call at the stop in front of the station. There are 220 free park and ride spaces for commuters. Local car parks have 800 bays, with another 200 to be added in a newly built car park at the western exit. There also is a guarded bicycle stand which can hold 780 bicycles.

Trains 
The station is an important hub with frequent services to Bielefeld, Münster, Dortmund, Hagen and Soest.

Hourly InterCityExpress services run to Berlin Ostbahnhof via Berlin Hbf, with trainsets coming from Cologne Bonn Airport (via Köln-Deutz, Düsseldorf, Duisburg, Essen Hauptbahnhof and Dortmund Hauptbahnhof) and Bonn Hbf (via Wuppertal and Hagen Hbf). The individual trainsets are then coupled together to continue their journey to Berlin via Bielefeld and Hannover.

A bi-hourly InterCity line runs from the Ruhr valley to Magdeburg Hbf via Hannover. Another IC line connects Hamm to Kassel-Wilhelmshöhe and Erfurt.

Furthermore, many local services call at the station. The RE lines 1, 3 and 13 terminate at Hamm, whilst RE lines 6, 7 and 11 as well as RB line 69 and 89 call at the station.

Hamm is also the terminus of the Hamm-Osterfelder Bahn, which lost its passenger traffic in 1983 but is still a notable freight railway.

References

Notes

Bibliography

External links 
Pictures of the derelict marshalling yard
DB station profile

Railway stations in North Rhine-Westphalia
Railway station
Art Deco railway stations
Railway stations in Germany opened in 1847
1847 establishments in Prussia